1957 in Korea may refer to:
1957 in North Korea
1957 in South Korea